Caleb Khristopher Love (born September 27, 2001) is an American college basketball player for the North Carolina Tar Heels of the Atlantic Coast Conference (ACC).

High school career
Love attended Christian Brothers College High School in St. Louis, Missouri and was coached by Justin Tatum (The father of NBA player Jayson Tatum). He averaged 18.9 points and 4.3 rebounds per game as a junior as he transitioned to point guard. He led the school to the Class 5 runner-up to Rock Bridge High School. Love scored a career-high 42 points against East St. Louis High School as a senior and also scored 40 points against Cardinal Ritter High School. As a senior, he averaged 26.3 points, 6.5 rebounds, 3.1 assists and 2.6 steals per game and led the team to the Class 5 Final Four. Love was named Mr. Show-Me Basketball and Gatorade Player of the Year in Missouri. He was named McDonald's All-American, becoming the second player from Christian Brothers to be so honored after Larry Hughes in 1997.

Recruiting
Love was the second-ranked point guard and No. 7 overall by 247Sports. He committed to playing college basketball for North Carolina on October 1, 2019, choosing the Tar Heels over Missouri, Louisville and Kansas, among others. Love was attracted to North Carolina because of coach Roy Williams and the opportunity to play lead guard.

College career

Freshman
In his college debut, Love led  all scorers with 17 points and posted four assists and two steals in a 79–60 win over the College of Charleston. On January 20, 2021, Love scored 20 points in a 80–73 win over Wake Forest. On January 25, 2021, Love was named ACC Freshman of the week. On February 6, 2021, Love scored a career-high 25 points and 7 assist in a 91–87 victory over rival Duke. On February 8, 2021, Love earned his second Atlantic Coast Conference (ACC) Freshman of the week honor. He was named to the ACC All-Freshman Team after averaging 10.5 points and 3.5 assists per game. Following the season, longtime Tar Heel head coach Roy Williams retired. After deliberating, Love decided to return to Chapel Hill for his sophomore season. He averaged 10.5 points, 2.6 rebounds, and 3.6 assists in his freshman season.

Sophomore
In head coach Hubert Davis' first season in charge after the retirement of Williams, Love was a key piece of a starting lineup that became known as the "Iron Five." The lineup included himself, R. J. Davis, Leaky Black, Oklahoma transfer Brady Manek, and Armando Bacot. In what began as an up-and-down season for both Love and the rest of the team, the "Iron Five" became crucial to the team's success down the stretch in their run to the National Championship game. In total on the season, Love set career highs in three point field goal percentage, games played, and starts, starting all but one of the 39 games played that season. He averaged 15.9 points, 3.4 rebounds, and 3.6 assists per game on the season, averaging 37.1% from the floor and 36% from beyond the three-point line. 

In the 2022 NCAA tournament, Love scored 27 of his career-high 30 points in the second half of a 73–66 win over fourth-seeded UCLA in the Sweet Sixteen. In the following Final Four matchup with the Duke Blue Devils, Love scored 28 points, including a late three-point shot seen as pivotal in the Tar Heels' 81–77 victory. In the Finals, he rolled his ankle, and was shooting poorly, but still had a chance to tie the game despite Kansas coming back in the second half. He missed a closely guarded step-back three-pointer, and UNC lost the title. He finished the game with 13 points on 5-of-24 shooting.

Junior
After the late-season success of the season prior, Love, Black, R.J. Davis, and Bacot all decided to return for the 2022-23 season. Despite a pre-season No.1 ranking and massive expectations, the season went awry quickly for Love and his teammates. Still, Love was a key piece of the starting lineup, and started 32 of the 33 games the team played (his lone appearance off the bench came on UNC's senior night, where tradition dictates that the starting lineup consist of all seniors on the team). The Tar Heels stumbled to a 20–13 record in Hubert Davis' second season. Love, despite shooting worse from the foul line and three-point line in his junior season, set new career highs in overall field-goal percentage (37.8%), points per game (16.7), and rebounds per game (3.7).

Career statistics

College

|-
| style="text-align:left;"| 2020–21
| style="text-align:left;"| North Carolina
| 29 || 25 || 27.7 || .316 || .266 || .808 || 2.6 || 3.6 || 1.2 || .3 || 10.5
|-
| style="text-align:left;"| 2021–22
| style="text-align:left;"| North Carolina
| 39 || 38 || 34.2 || .371 || .360 || .863 || 3.4 || 3.6 || .9 || .2 || 15.9
|-
| style="text-align:left;"| 2022–23
| style="text-align:left;"| North Carolina
| 33 || 32 || 35.8 || .378 || .299 || .765 || 3.7 || 2.8 || 1.1 || .2 || 16.7
|- class="sortbottom"
| style="text-align:center;" colspan="2"| Career
|| 101 || 95 || 32.8 || .360 || .317 || .815 || 3.3 || 3.3 || 1.0 || .3 || 14.6

References

External links
North Carolina Tar Heels bio
USA Basketball bio

2001 births
Living people
American men's basketball players
Basketball players from St. Louis
McDonald's High School All-Americans
North Carolina Tar Heels men's basketball players
Point guards
Shooting guards